Fran may refer to:

People and fictional characters
 Fran (given name), including a list of people and fictional characters
 Fran (footballer, born 1969) or Francisco Javier González Pérez
 Fran (footballer, born 1972), Spanish retired footballer Francisco José Nogueira Maneiro
 Fran (footballer, born February 1992), Spanish footballer Francisco Pérez Gil
 Fran (footballer, born May 1992), Brazilian footballer Francisco Teocharis Papaiordanou Filho
 Fran (footballer, born 1995), Spanish footballer Francisco José Rodríguez Gaitán
 Carol Fran (1933–2021), American soul blues singer, pianist and songwriter Carol Augustus Anthony
 Jan Fran (born 1985), Lebanese-Australian journalist and presenter Jeanette Francis
 José Fran (born 1992), Spanish footballer José Francisco Agulló Sevilla

Other uses
 Tropical Storm Fran, a list of hurricanes, typhoons, tropical storms and a cyclone in the Atlantic or western Pacific Oceans
 Fran (film), a 1985 Australian film
 Fran (comics), a 2013 graphic novel by Jim Woodring
 Fran (band), an American indie rock band

See also
 Dennis Franchione, former college football coach known as Coach Fran
 US FRAN, a Burkinabé football club based in Bobo Dioulasso